Shoofly and similar may refer to:

 Shoofly pie
 "Shoo Fly, Don't Bother Me", a traditional children's song.
 "Shoo-Fly Pie and Apple Pan Dowdy", a song first performed by June Christy.
 Shoofly Comer aka Niviatsinaq, Aivilingmiut (Canadian Inuit) wife of American whaling captain George Comer
 Shue Fly, a Quarter Horse racehorse during the 1940s
 Shoofly, a common name for the plant species Biancaea decapetala
 Shoo Fly (sternwheeler), a steamboat which operated on the Willamette and Columbia Rivers from 1871 to 1878.
 Shoo Fly Complex, a geological rock formation in the Sierra Nevada in California, USA
 Shoo-fly plant, Nicandra physalodes, a species of flowering plant in subfamily Solanoideae of the nightshade family
 Shoofly, a temporary short routing around a small construction site or other obstruction
Rail shoofly: See 
Road shoofly: See